Lee Wai Lun (born March 7, 1981, in Hong Kong) is a former Hong Kong professional footballer who currently plays as an amateur for Hong Kong First Division club Eastern District. He was a member of the Hong Kong national football team.

Club career

Pegasus
On 24 Oct 2013, Lee announced that he would retire from professional football. Two days later, Lee was made captain in his final game against Tuen Mun. Lee scored a goal in extra time and Pegasus won the game by 6–0. After the game, Lee received hugs from his fellow players and manager, as well as a standing ovation from the fans.

Career statistics

Club
As of 20 September 2008

International
As of 14 February 2010

References

External links
Lee Wai Lun at HKFA

1981 births
Living people
Hong Kong footballers
Association football defenders
Kitchee SC players
Sun Hei SC players
South China AA players
Hong Kong First Division League players
TSW Pegasus FC players
Hong Kong international footballers
Footballers at the 2002 Asian Games
Asian Games competitors for Hong Kong
Hong Kong League XI representative players